Marianne Vermaat (born 2 May 1955) is a former backstroke swimmer from the Netherlands, who competed for her native country at the 1972 Summer Olympics in Munich, West Germany. There she was eliminated in the semi-finals of the 100 m backstroke, clocking 1:09.11 (16th place).

External links

 

1955 births
Living people
Dutch female backstroke swimmers
Olympic swimmers of the Netherlands
Swimmers at the 1972 Summer Olympics
People from Vlaardingen
Sportspeople from South Holland
20th-century Dutch women